Fishgut Creek is a stream in the U.S. state of South Dakota.

Fishgut Creek has the name of Fish Gut, a Sioux Indian who settled nearby.

See also
List of rivers of South Dakota

References

Rivers of Dewey County, South Dakota
Rivers of South Dakota